The West Mitchell Street Bridge is a bridge carrying West Mitchell Street and US Highway 31 (US 31) over the Bear River in Petoskey, Michigan. It was added to the National Register of Historic Places in 1986.

History
The Michigan State Highway Department constructed this bridge in 1930 under the supervision of State Highway Commissioner Grover C. Dillman. The MSHD contracted with Whitney Brothers to build the bridge.

Description
The West Mitchell Street Bridge is a seven-span highway T-beam bridge constructed of reinforced concrete, with broad ogee arches supporting each span. The deck is asphalt, lined by sidewalks and side balustrades. The bridge is extensively detailed, with Moderne features.

See also

References

External links
Gallery of photos

National Register of Historic Places in Michigan
Streamline Moderne architecture in the United States
Bridges completed in 1930
Emmet County, Michigan